The Calling of Saints Peter and Andrew is a painting by the Italian Baroque master Caravaggio. It takes its theme from a passage in the Gospel of Matthew describing the moment when Christ called the two brothers Simon – later known as Peter – and Andrew, to be his disciples:

The painting shows a young, beardless Christ, leading the two much older-looking brothers. The more prominent of the brothers, presumably Simon, is holding a fish in his right hand. The edge of the canvas is rather damaged, but the central panel is in good condition. The presence of "incisions" into the ground of the canvas marking out St. Peter's ear and the eyes of Christ are typical of Caravaggio's technique. The painting appears to date from the height of Caravaggio's Roman period, c. 1603–06.

Provenance
The work was purchased by Charles I, an avid art collector, in 1637. Sold during the Commonwealth, it was re-acquired by Charles II after the Restoration. It has since remained in the Royal Collection, and in 2022 was on display in Hampton Court Palace near London.  It was long believed to be a relatively valueless copy of a lost original, but after six years of restoration and examination the Royal Collection declared on 10 November 2006, that this was, in fact, an authentic Caravaggio. The verdict has been corroborated by external experts, and the painting is now probably worth more than £50 million.  But works from the Royal Collection are not sold as the collection is held in trust for the nation.

After a 6-year cleaning project, it went on display as part of a small exhibition of Caravaggio paintings at the Termini Art Gallery in Rome's Termini Station from 22 November to 31 January  2006.  It then moved to an exhibition (from March 2007) of Italian Baroque and Renaissance art at the Queen's Gallery, Buckingham Palace.  In 2015 it was put on display in the Cumberland Gallery in Hampton Court Palace.

See also
List of paintings by Caravaggio

Footnotes

External links
"The Queen finds a Caravaggio in her storeroom", Nigel Reynolds, The Daily Telegraph, 11 November 2006. URL last accessed 19 November 2006.
"Art clean-up uncovers Old Master", BBC News, 14 February 2004. URL last accessed 19 November 2006.
"Long-lost Caravaggio unveiled", Australia News, November 21, 2006 05:09, last accessed on that date

1600s paintings
Paintings by Caravaggio
Paintings depicting Jesus
Paintings in the Royal Collection of the United Kingdom
Hampton Court Palace
Paintings depicting Saint Peter